Maurice Maillot (18 September 1906 – 8 February 1968) was a French film and theater actor. He was born in Rethel, Ardennes, and died in Paris.

Selected filmography
 The Indictment (1931)
 The Wandering Beast (1932)
Odette (1934) 
 Merchant of Love (1935)
Whirlpool of Desire (1935, US release 1939)
 Camp Thirteen (1940)
 Dorothy Looks for Love (1945)

References

External links

1906 births
1968 deaths
People from Ardennes (department)
French male film actors
20th-century French male actors